The Catholic Church in Austria is currently composed of :
 two ecclesiastical provinces and 7 suffragan dioceses of the western Latin Church
 an exempt military ordinate and a territorial abbey, both also Latin Rite. 
 an ordinariate for Eastern Catholic faithful, Byzantine Rite

 Current Dioceses

 Austrian Episcopal Conference (Latin) 

 Latin Exempt Sui iuris Jurisdictions 
 Military Ordinariate of Austria
 Territorial Abbey of Wettingen-Mehrerau

 Ecclesiastical Province of Salzburg 
 Metropolitan Archdiocese of Salzburg, primatial see of all Austria 
 Diocese of Feldkirch 
 Diocese of Graz-Seckau
 Diocese of Gurk-Klagenfurt
 Diocese of Innsbruck

 Ecclesiastical Province of Vienna 
 Metropolitan Archdiocese of Vienna 
 Diocese of Eisenstadt 
 Diocese of Linz
 Diocese of Sankt Pölten

 Eastern Catholic Exempt Sui iuris Ordinariate for Eastern Catholic faithful 
 Ordinariate for Byzantine-rite Catholics in Austria Defunct jurisdictions 

 Latin Titular sees 

 Metropolitan titular archbishoprics 
 Metropolitan Archdiocese of Tiburnia
 Metropolitan Archdiocese of Lauriacum

 Titular bishoprics 
 Ancient Diocese of Aguntum
 Ancient Diocese of Virunum
 Roman Catholic Diocese of Wiener Neustadt

 Other defunct jurisdictions Excluding precursors of present dioceses that were merely renamed or promoted''

 Ancient Diocese of Juvavo
 Roman Catholic Diocese of Lavant (Lavanttal, Lavantin(us)), united with Metropolitan Archdiocese of Maribor
 Roman Catholic Diocese of Leoben, merged into Diocese of Graz–Seckau  
 Stift Sankt Peter Salzburg, an Abbacy nullius

Sources and external links 
 GCatholic.org - data for all sections.
 Catholic-Hierarchy

Austria
Catholic dioceses